Yi Kuang may refer to:

Yikuang (1838–1917), formally Prince Qing, Qing dynasty politician
Ni Kuang (born 1935), Chinese writer